Aníbal da Fonseca Paciência (born 11 May 1915 - deceased) was a Portuguese footballer, who played as a midfielder.

External links 
 
 
 

1915 births
Portuguese footballers
Association football midfielders
Primeira Liga players
Sporting CP footballers
Portugal international footballers
Year of death missing